The Segundo River ('Second River'), also known as Xanaes, is a river in the center-north of the province of Córdoba, Argentina. It flows west–east and its course forms a reservoir at the Los Molinos Dam (at ), which is employed to generate hydroelectricity. It then flows to the northeast and divides into two main arms, which empty in the Mar Chiquita salt lake,  from its origin.

Together with the Primero River (Suquía) and the Dulce River, it forms part of the basin of Central Argentina. On its path are located the following cities: Río Segundo, Pilar, Villa del Rosario, Tránsito, Arroyito, El Tío, Concepción del Tío, Marull, Balnearia and Altos de Chipión.

The alternative name of Xanaes is said to have its origin in the Native American language of the Comechingones, and has been almost lost until the 1980s, when Xanaes was started being used in maps, perhaps to attract tourism with a more exotic name, but the population of the area continues to use the denomination Segundo.

References
 Hydrography of Córdoba
 Río Segundo in the Spanish Wikipedia.

Rivers of Argentina
Rivers of Córdoba Province, Argentina